Verrey may refer to:

David Verrey, British actor
Verrey-sous-Drée, French commune
Verrey-sous-Salmaise, French commune